Iqram Rifqi bin Mohammad Yazid (born 25 February 1996) is a Singaporean professional footballer who plays as a defender for Singapore Premier League club Balestier Khalsa and the Singapore national team.

In May 2017, he was named Most Valuable Player of the tournament at Adidas’ Singapore edition of the worldwide futsal campaign Tango League.

Club career

Home United
After graduating from the NFA squad, he moved to play for the Home United Prime League squad.  He was promoted to the squad in 2018.

He has held his own among his more illustrious teammates since making his senior debut in a Singapore Cup match against Warriors FC in July. He made ten appearances in the 2017 S.League.

International career
Iqram was first called up to the national team in 2019, for the friendly against Qatar on 14 November 2019 and World Cup qualifiers against Yemen on 19 November. Iqram made his first professional start and debut on 14 November against Qatar.

Career statistics

Club

International

References

Singaporean footballers
Singapore international footballers
1996 births
Living people
Home United FC players
Singapore Premier League players
Association football forwards
Lion City Sailors FC players